Akihiro Nishimura may refer to:

 Akihiro Nishimura (politician) (born 1960), Japanese politician of the Liberal Democratic Party
 Akihiro Nishimura (footballer) (born 1958), former Japanese footballer